This article details the qualifying phase for diving at the 2016 Summer Olympics. The competition at these Games will comprise a total of 136 athletes coming from the different nations; each has been allowed to enter not more than 16 divers (up to eight males and eight females) with only two in individual events and a pair in synchronized events.

Summary 
For individual diving, the top twelve from the 2015 World Championships, the five continental champions and the eighteen semifinalists at the 2016 Diving World Cup will achieve a quota spot. For the pairs events, the top three from the world championships, the top four from the world cup and the hosts qualify.

FINA final list - 10 July 2016

Timeline

Synchronized diving

Men's 3 m synchronized springboard

Men's 10 m synchronized platform

Women's 3 m synchronized springboard

Women's 10 m synchronized platform

Individual diving

Men's 3 m springboard
For the individual events, any one diver can only gain 1 quota place per event for their NOC.

Men's 10 m platform
For the individual events, any one diver can only gain 1 quota place per event for their NOC.

Women's 3 m springboard
For the individual events, any one diver can only gain 1 quota place per event for their NOC.

1. South Africa was awarded a quota place through the continental qualifier, but later declined, as SASCOC made an agreement on the Rio 2016 Olympics qualification criteria that the Continental Qualification route would not be considered.

Women's 10 m platform
For the individual events, any one diver can only gain 1 quota place per event for their NOC.

References

Qualification for the 2016 Summer Olympics
2015 in diving
2016 in diving
Qualification